The Johnson City Cardinals were a Minor League Baseball team based in Johnson City, Tennessee. The team was affiliated with the St. Louis Cardinals organization from 1975 through 2020 and played in the Rookie-level Appalachian League. The team won 10 league championships, most recently in 2019. They played their home games at TVA Credit Union Ballpark. Before 1975, the team operated under several other names and affiliations.

The start of the 2020 season was postponed due to the COVID-19 pandemic before ultimately being cancelled on June 30. In conjunction with a contraction of Minor League Baseball beginning with the 2021 season, the Appalachian League was reorganized as a collegiate summer baseball league, and the Cardinals were replaced by the Johnson City Doughboys, a new franchise in the revamped league designed for rising college freshmen and sophomores.

Playoffs
In 1955, Johnson City and the Salem Rebels were declared co-champions of the Appalachian League when their final playoff series was canceled due to rain.

From 1986 to 2019, Johnson City reached the playoffs by virtue of winning their division or clinching a playoff spot eight times. The results of their postseason play during this time was as follows.
1986: Lost to Pulaski 2–1 in finals.
1987: Lost to Burlington 2–0 in finals.
1994: Lost to Princeton 2–1 in finals.
2010: Defeated Burlington 2–0 in semifinals; defeated Elizabethton 2–0 to win championship.
2011: Defeated Danville 2–1 in semifinals; defeated Bluefield 2–1 to win championship.
2012: Lost to Burlington 2–1 in semifinals.
2014: Defeated Elizabethton 2–1 in semifinals; defeated Danville 2–1 to win championship.
2016: Defeated Elizabethton 2–1 in semifinals; defeated Burlington 2–0 to win championship.
2019: Defeated Bristol 2–1 in semifinals; defeated Burlington 2–1 to win championship.

Notable alumni
Many of the players fielded by Johnson City have gone on to distinguish themselves in Major League Baseball.

Matt Adams (2009)
Rick Ankiel (2001)
Ron Blomberg (1967)
Glenn Brummer (1975)
 Danny Cater (1958) 
Vince Coleman (1982) 2 x MLB All-Star; 1985 NL Rookie of the Year
 Pat Corrales (1959)
Danny Cox (1981)
Coco Crisp (1999) 
Tony Cruz (2007)
 Ray Culp (1959) 2 x MLB All-Star
 Joe Cunningham (1949) 2 x MLB All-Star
 Jeff Fassero (1984)
Curt Ford (1981)
Ron Guidry (1971) 4 x MLB All-Star; 2 x AL ERA Leader (1978-1979); 1978 AL CY Young Award
 Cesar Geronimo (1967)
 Mike Heath (1974)
Tom Herr (1975) MLB All-Star
 LaMarr Hoyt (1973) MLB All-Star; 1983 AL Cy Young Award
Stan Javier (1981-82)
Terry Kennedy (1977) 4 x MLB All-Star
Ray Lankford (1987) MLB All-Star
Joe Magrane (1985) 1988 NL ERA Leader
Yadier Molina (2001) 8 x Gold Glove; 9 x MLB All-Star
 Bill Monbouquette (1969, MGR) 4 x MLB All-Star
Jason Motte (2003) 2012 NL Saves Leader
Bobby Murcer (1964) 5 x MLB All-Star
Ken Oberkfell (1975) 
Terry Pendleton (1982) MLB All-Star; 1991 NL Most Valuable Player
David Peralta (2006-07) Gold Glove, Silver Slugger
Tommy Pham (2006)
Ryan Sherriff (2011)
 Chris Short (1957) 2 x MLB All-Star
Oscar Taveras (2010) Died, age 22
 Otto Velez (1970)
Jack Wilson (1998) 2004 MLB All-Star
 Bobby Wine (1957) Gold Glove
Dmitri Young (1991) 2 x MLB All-Star

References

External links 
 
 Statistics from Baseball-Reference

Defunct Appalachian League teams
Baseball teams established in 1937
Baseball teams disestablished in 2020
Professional baseball teams in Tennessee
1937 establishments in Tennessee
2020 disestablishments in Tennessee
Johnson City, Tennessee